The women's 1500 metres at the 2012 European Athletics Championships were held at the Helsinki Olympic Stadium on 30 June and 1 July.

The dirtiest race in history
In this race, the first four classified were disqualified for doping, meaning the medals went to the athletes who reached the finish line in 5th to 7th place.

On 25 February 2016, the IAAF announced that Mischenko, the silver medal winner, had been found to have irregularities in her biological passport. She was banned from competition for two years until 17 August 2017, and all her results since June 28, 2012 were deleted from the records, including the silver medal won in this event.

After the disqualifications, Nuria Fernández of Spain was declared the winner of the event.

Medalists

Records

Schedule

Results

Round 1
First 4 in each heat (Q) and 4 best performers (q) advance to the Final.

Final

References

 Round 1 Results
 Final Results
 European Athletics Championships - Helsinki 2012
Full results

1500 W
1500 metres at the European Athletics Championships
2012 in women's athletics